Belgorod Oblast is a federal subject of Russia (an oblast). Its administrative center is the city of Belgorod. Population:

History

At the turn of the 17th century, a solid line of military fortifications was built in the area, stretching for almost . Zaporozhian Cossacks, who moved here because of the nobility and the tax burden, were in charge of the line defenses.  Even more Cossacks moved to the area during the Khmelnytsky Uprising (1648–1657) and the internecine wars in the Cossack Hetmanate (1659–1679).  Belgorod became the military and administrative center, after originating as an outpost on the southern borders of Russia.

Following the Battle of Poltava, Peter I granted to soldiers of Greater Belgorod the regiment flag.

From 1708 to 1727, the territory of the modern Belgorod Oblast was part of the Kiev and Azov governorates. In 1727, Belgorod Governorate was established from parts of Kiev Governorate. The governorate lasted until 1779. This territory was much greater than that of today, and the governorate incorporated territories modern Kursk, Oryol, and parts of Bryansk and Kharkiv oblasts.  The coat of arms of the then-Governorate is still used by the modern Belgorod Oblast.

In 1775–1779, the territory of Belgorod Governorate was abolished and divided between the newly formed governorates and vice-royalties.  The city of Belgorod and the area around it became a part of Kursk Vice-Royalty, while the southeastern uyezds became a part of Voronezh Governorate.

During the 19th century and up until 1928 the territory of modern Belgorod Oblast remained part of the Kursk and Voronezh governorates. After the signing of the Treaty of Brest-Litovsk in April 1918, in January 1919 the territory was incorporated into the Ukrainian State under hetman Pavlo Skoropadskyi.

The current administrative-territorial boundaries of Belgorod Oblast were formed by the Decree of the Presidium of the Supreme Soviet of the USSR on 6 January 1954. The oblast was formed from several districts of Kursk and Voronezh Oblasts.

For the courage and resilience shown by the people of Belgorod Oblast in defense of the Motherland during the Great Patriotic War, and for progress in reconstruction and development of national economy. On 4 January 1967, Belgorod Oblast was awarded the Order of Lenin, and in 1980 the city of Belgorod was awarded the Order of the Patriotic War, first degree.

In 2007, the city of Belgorod received the honorary title of the City of Military Glory.

Geography
Belgorod Oblast is part of the Central Black Earth economic region and the Central Federal District. It borders with Luhansk, Kharkiv, and Sumy Oblasts of Ukraine in the south and west, Kursk Oblast in the north and northwest, and Voronezh Oblast in the east.

The lowest point is located at the bottom of the Oskol and Seversky Donets River valleys.

Climate
The climate of Belgorod Oblast is temperate continental with a relatively mild winter with some snowfall and long summers. The coldest month is January and the frost-free period is 155–160 days, with an average of 1800 hours of sunshine. Rainfall is uneven by year and season,  with an average of 540–550 mm although rainfall can dramatically differ between the western and northern areas and the warmer, drier eastern and southeast where some years lows of around  have been recorded.

Natural resources
Over 40% of known iron ore reserves of Russia are concentrated in the oblast.  Deposits are confined to the Kursk Magnetic Anomaly area. Among them are Korobkovsky, Lebedinskoye, Stoylenskoye, and prospective Prioskolskoye iron ore deposits in Stary Oskol District, Bolshetroitskoye in Shebekinsky District, as well as Yakovlevskoye and Pogremetskoye fields.

Identified and explored in varying degrees are the large deposits of bauxites, apatites, underground mineral waters, and numerous deposits of construction materials such as chalk, sand, clay, and more. There are also known occurrences of gold, graphite, and other rare metals.  Geographical features make the oblast likely to have deposits of platinum, hydrocarbons, and other minerals.

Hydrography

Rivers, lakes, and marshes occupy about 1% of the oblast's territory. There are more than 480 small rivers and streams. The largest of them are in the northwest — the Seversky Donets, Vorskla, Vorsklitsa, Psyol, and in the eastern regions — the Oskol, Tikhaya Sosna, Chyornaya Kalitva, Valuy.

Wildlife

The fauna of Belgorod Oblast is predominantly of the meadow-steppe variety and comprises, by various estimates, from ten to fifteen thousand species.

About 10% of the animal species are in need of special protection. Fifty species are included in the IUCN Red List. There are about 279 species of birds, including 152 which breed in the oblast. The richest bird populations include sparrows (111 species); waders (45 species); geese (up to 30 species); day predators (21 species). The richest bird populations include sparrows (111 species); waders (45 species); geese (up to 30 species); day predators (21 species). The numbers of game animal species are as follows: moose – 387; deer – 501; roe deer – 4474; boar – 2574; hare – 18361; fox – 3856; marten – 2025; polecat – 1120; wolf – 36. The annual number of game animals remains stable.

Vegetation
Vegetation in Belgorod Oblast reflects the features of the northern forest-steppe, characterized by the alternation of forests with the meadow steppes. It is chiefly represented by two types of vegetation — the zonal and extrazonal.  In all, there are 1,284 flora species.  Woodlands cover 9.8% of the total area, of which over 800 hectares are classified as protected areas because their rare species of plants and habitats of animals are on the IUCN red list.

Culture

The Belgorod region played a significant role in the evolution of Russian culture.
It was inhabited by different tribes besides East Slavs and was one of the earliest Rus' principalities. Belgorod region played an important role in the Russian wedding tradition of the Rushnyk. Belgorod is also famous for its wood carving.

Politics

During the Soviet period, the high authority in the oblast was shared between three persons: The first secretary of the Belgorod CPSU Committee (who in reality had the biggest authority), the chairman of the oblast Soviet (legislative power), and the Chairman of the oblast Executive Committee (executive power). Since 1991, CPSU lost all the power, and the head of the Oblast administration, and eventually the governor was appointed/elected alongside elected regional parliament.

The Charter of Belgorod Oblast is the fundamental law of the region. The Legislative Assembly of Belgorod Oblast is the province's standing legislative (representative) body. The Legislative Assembly exercises its authority by passing laws, resolutions, and other legal acts and by supervising the implementation and observance of the laws and other legal acts passed by it. The highest executive body is the Oblast Government, which includes territorial executive bodies such as district administrations, committees, and commissions that facilitate development and run the day to day matters of the province. The Oblast administration supports the activities of the Governor who is the highest official and acts as guarantor of the observance of the oblast Charter in accordance with the Constitution of Russia.

The governor of Belgorod Oblast, Yevgeny Savchenko, was first appointed to this position in 1993 and subsequently re-elected in 1995, 1999, 2003, 2012 and 2017. In the 1999 election, his rival was Vladimir Zhirinovsky. Savchenko holds the title of longest-serving governor in post-Soviet Russia, being in office for 27 years. Since November 2020, Vyacheslav Gladkov is the governor of Belgorod Oblast.

On 13 September 2020, elections to the 7th Belgorod Oblast Duma were conducted. The United Russia Party has won 44 out of 50 seats, 4 seats were won by the Communist Party, 1 by the LDPR, and 1 by the Russian Party of Pensioners for Social Justice.

Demographics

In terms of area, the oblast is in the 67th place among the federal subjects of Russia; while in terms of population it is 28th (as of the results of the 2010 Census, up two places compared to the 2002 Census results. According to the results of the 2010 Census, the population of the oblast was 1,532,526, with the urban population of 66.1% and the rural population of 33.9%. This is up from 1,511,620 recorded in the 2002 Census, and 1,380,723 recorded in the 1989 Census.

Population density in 2008 was 56.1 persons per 1 km2. The average age is 38.5 years—35.6 for men and 41 for women; 46% of the population are economically active.

As in other regions of the European part of Russia, since the dissolution of the Soviet Union there has been a natural population decrease (about -5 per 1,000 of the population). In recent years, there has been some reversion of this decline as a result of growth of fertility and mortality. Nevertheless, despite the negative trend of growth, the population of the area has remained relatively stable because of immigration. Belgorod, even in Soviet times, attracted retirement workers from the Far North and Ukraine. This trend has increased since 2005 and now cancels out the natural decline in population. Worker migrants also arrive in Belgorod from Uzbekistan; though unlike Ukrainian immigrants, Muslim migrants face discrimination on a daily basis, and choose to leave.

Settlements

Ethnic composition

245,098 people (or 15.9% of the population) residing in the Belgorod oblast did not state their ethnicity in the 2021 census.
44,012 people were registered from administrative databases, and could not declare an ethnicity. It is estimated that the proportion of ethnicities in this group is the same as that of the declared group.

Religion

According to a 2012 survey 50.5% of the population of Belgorod Oblast adheres to the Russian Orthodox Church, 8.1% are nondenominational Christians (excluding Protestant churches), 1.7% are Orthodox Christians who don't belong to the Russian Orthodox Church. In addition, 22.2% of the population declares to be spiritual but not religious, 10.5% is atheist or irreligious, and 7% follows other religions or did not give an answer to the question.

Administrative divisions

Belgorod Oblast is administratively divided into twenty-one districts (raions), which are further divided into 335 rural okrugs.  There are ten cities/towns in the oblast, as well as twenty urban-type settlements and 1,592 rural-type settlements.

Economy

Belgorod Oblast is a highly developed industrial-agrarian region, whose economy relies on its enormous wealth of mineral resources and the unique black soils.

Belgorod Oblast has traditionally had and still has strong ties with the agro-industrial complex of Ukraine. Despite its relatively small size, the oblast accounts for one fifth of the trade turnover between Russia and Ukraine.

Some 2,713.4 thousand hectares is dedicated to agriculture, over 70% of which are chernozems. Per capita, there are an average of 1.43 hectares of pastoral land, and 1.1 hectares of arable land. Natural forests and forest plantations occupy 248.3 thousand hectares, or 12.5% of the oblast's area.  Total timber reserves are estimated to be 34.3 million m3.

Transport

Important railways and highways of regional significance cross the oblast's territory, connecting Moscow with the southern and western regions of Russia and Ukraine. Of major importance is the Crimea Highway, or federal highway M-2 Crimea, and the Moscow-Kharkiv-Sevastopol railway line. The length of railways for general use is 694.6 km; the length of paved roads is 8,500 km; roughly 87% of the total road surface in the oblast.

References

Notes

Sources

External links

 Official website of Belgorod Oblast 
Belgorod Oblast sceneries photos

 
States and territories established in 1954
Oblasts of Russia